Schotte is a surname. Notable people with the surname include:

 Apollonius Schotte (c. 1579–1639), Dutch statesman, jurist and poet
 Briek Schotte  (1919–2004), Belgian professional cyclist
 Gerrit Schotte (born 1974), politician from Curaçao
 Jacques Schotte (1928–2007), Belgian psychiatrist and psychoanalyst
 Jan Pieter Schotte (1928–2005), Belgian Cardinal

Ethnonymic surnames